The women's tournament of the 2012 European Curling Championships was held at the Löfbergs Lila Arena and the Karlstad Curling Club in Karlstad, Sweden from December 7 to 15. The winners of the Group C tournament in Erzurum, Turkey moved on to the Group B tournament. The top seven women's teams at the 2012 European Curling Championships, Russia,  Scotland, Sweden, Denmark, Switzerland, Italy and Germany, will represent their respective nations at the 2013 World Women's Curling Championship in Riga, Latvia.

In the Group A competitions, Sweden, Scotland, and Russia finished at the top of the round robin standings with two losses apiece. Denmark defeated Switzerland in a tiebreaker to advance to the playoffs. The page playoffs saw defending champions Scotland rout Sweden and Russia edge past Denmark. Sweden dropped to the bronze medal game after a surprising loss in the semifinal to Russia, who stole the 8–6 win in an extra end. Hometown favorite Sweden, skipped by Margaretha Sigfridsson, recovered by defeating Denmark's Lene Nielsen with a score of 9–3 to win the bronze medal. Russia then played Scotland in the final, and stole one point in the first and fifth ends to hold the lead at the break, and stole one more point in the second half of the game. Scotland's Eve Muirhead managed to hang on with two deuces, and tied the game in the tenth end. Russia's Anna Sidorova secured a second European championship for Russia with a hit in the extra end, winning with a score of 6–5.

The Group C competitions in Erzurum saw Belarus and Turkey advancing to the Group B competitions, where they and two other teams played in a round robin tournament. Undefeated Norway dominated the round robin, and defeated Estonia in the page playoffs to advance to the final. Latvia moved up to the semifinal with a win over Austria in the page playoffs, and defeated Estonia in the semifinal to advance to the final. Austria defeated Estonia in the bronze medal game with a score of 8–5, while Norway's winning streak was broken with a 7–4 loss to Latvia. Latvia and Norway advance to the Group A competitions, replacing Finland and Hungary, and Belarus and Slovakia were relegated to the Group C competitions. Latvia were scheduled to play Germany in the World Challenge Games, but qualified to the world championships automatically as hosts.

Group A

Teams
The teams are listed as follows:

Round-robin standings
Final round-robin standings

Round-robin results

Draw 1
Saturday, December 8, 14:00

Draw 2
Sunday, December 9, 8:00

Draw 3
Sunday, December 9, 16:00

Draw 4
Monday, December 10, 9:00

Draw 5
Monday, December 10, 19:00

Draw 6
Tuesday, December 11, 12:00

Draw 7
Tuesday, December 11, 20:00

Draw 8
Wednesday, December 12, 14:00

Draw 9
Thursday, December 13, 8:00

Tiebreaker
Thursday, December 13, 15:00

Placement game
Thursday, December 13, 15:00

 was scheduled to play in the World Challenge Games, a best-of-three series with the winner of Group B to determine which team advances to the World Women's Championships, but the winner of Group B, Latvia, was qualified as the host of the World Women's Championships, so Germany qualified automatically.

Playoffs

1 vs. 2
Friday, December 14, 13:00

3 vs. 4
Friday, December 14, 13:00

Semifinal
Friday, December 14, 20:00

Bronze-medal game
Saturday, December 15, 10:00

Gold-medal game
Saturday, December 15, 10:00

Player percentages
Round Robin only

Group B

Teams
The teams are listed as follows:

Round-robin results
Final round-robin standings

Draw 1
Saturday, December 8, 12:00

Draw 2
Saturday, December 8, 20:00

Draw 3
Sunday, December 9, 12:00

Draw 4
Sunday, December 9, 20:00

Draw 5
Monday, December 10, 12:00

Draw 6
Monday, December 10, 20:00

Draw 7
Tuesday, December 11, 12:00

Draw 8
Tuesday, December 11, 20:00

Draw 9
Wednesday, December 12, 12:00

Playoffs

1 vs. 2
Thursday, December 13, 20:00

3 vs. 4
Thursday, December 13, 20:00

Semifinal
Friday, December 14, 8:00

Bronze-medal game
Friday, December 14, 13:00

Gold-medal game
Friday, December 14, 13:00

Group C

Teams
The teams are listed as follows:

Round-robin standings
Final round-robin standings

Round-robin results

Draw 1
Friday, October 5, 17:30

Draw 2
Saturday, October 6, 9:00

Draw 3
Saturday, October 6, 13:00

Draw 4
Sunday, October 7, 9:00

Draw 5
Sunday, October 7, 14:00

Draw 6
Sunday, October 7, 19:00

Draw 7
Monday, October 8, 9:00

Draw 8
Monday, October 8, 14:00

Draw 9
Monday, October 8, 19:00

Playoffs
In the playoffs, the first and second seeds, Turkey and Belarus, played a semifinal game to determine the first team to advance to the Group B competitions. The loser of this game, along with the winners of the semifinal game played by the third and fourth seeds, the Netherlands and Croatia, advance to the second place game, which determines the second team to advance to the Group B competitions.

Semifinals
Tuesday, October 9, 18:00

 advances to the Group B competitions.
 moves to Second Place Game.

 advances to Second Place Game

Second Place Game
Wednesday, October 10, 10:00

 advances to the Group B competitions.

References
General

Specific

External links

European Curling Championships
2012 in curling
International curling competitions hosted by Turkey
2012 in Turkish women's sport
Sport in Erzurum
Women's curling competitions in Sweden
International curling competitions hosted by Sweden
Sports competitions in Karlstad
2012 in Swedish women's sport
European Championships